BC Espoir Fukash is a Congolese basketball team based in Kinshasa. The team plays in the Liprobakin, as well as in the Basketball Africa League (BAL) for the 2022 season. The team has won the Kinshasa title one time in 2021, and have won the Congolese Cup in 2021.

History
Created in 2019, Espoir reached the final of the Ligue Provinciale de Kinshasa for the first time in 2020. However, the team lost to BC Terreur. The following season, the team won their first regional championship. In October 2021, Espoir Fukash won the Congolese Cup, their first national trophy in club history. As such, they qualified for the 2022 BAL Qualifying Tournaments. They won their first international game, on 30 October 2021, over Tondema with 102–49. On December 15, Espoir qualified for the 2022 BAL season after eliminating Mali's AS Police in the semi-finals, winning after overtime. As such, the team becomes the first club from the Democratic Republic of the Congo to play in the BAL.

In the 2022 BAL Nile Conference, Espoir finished in the sixth and last place with a 1–4 record. On April 20, 2022, the team captured its first BAL victory after beating Cape Town Tigers after overtime.

Honours
Coupe du Congo
Winners (1): 2021
Liprobakin
Champions (1): 2021
Runner-up (1): 2020

Players

Current roster 
The following is the Espoir Fukash roster for the 2022 BAL season group phase.

Season by season

References

Basketball Africa League teams
Basketball teams in the Democratic Republic of the Congo
Basketball teams established in 2019
Sport in Kinshasa
Road to BAL teams